Hanza Tower is a skyscraper in Szczecin, Poland, located at the 50 Wyzwolenia Avenue, in the Śródmieście-Północ municipal neighbourhood. The building is 125 m tall, making it the tallest building in the city. It has 34 floors, including 4 underground. Its construction begun in 2011, and had been finished in 2021. The building had been designed in the shape of the ship sail, with the project made by companies Laguarda Low and Urbicon.

Description 
The skyscraper is located in the city of Szczecin, Poland, at the 50 Wyzwolenia Avenue, in the Śródmieście-Północ municipal neighbourhood. It was designed in the traditional and High-tech style, and shaped to look like a sail of a ship.

Of that, is for the residential space located in the upper levels, while , for the commercial and service space, located at the lower ones. Its underground car park can house 383 vehicles.

History 
The construction of the building begun in September 2011. It was designed by the companies Laguarda Low, and Urbicon, and it was constructed by Calbud, and J.W. Construction. The name of the building comes from the Hanseatic League, which short name, Hansa, is known in Polish as Hanza. The cost of the investment was estimated to be between 150 and 200 million Polish złoty. The construction was planned to end in late 2020, however, following changes to the building's plans, it was moved to March 2021.

Gallery

References

Buildings and structures in Szczecin
Skyscrapers in Poland
Residential skyscrapers in Poland
2021 establishments in Poland
Buildings and structures completed in 2021
Commercial buildings completed in 2021
Residential buildings completed in 2021